Petro Pysarchuk (born June 6, 1955, in Chemeryntsi, village, Peremyshliany Raion, Lviv Oblast, Ukrainian SSR) is a Ukrainian Politician and Entrepreneur. People's Deputy to the Verkhovna Rada of Ukraine 4th, 5th and 6th convocations.

Career
P.Pysarchuk graduated from Lviv Polytechnic Institute in 1977,speciality:  heat and power engineer. From 1977 he associated as the Secretary of Komsomol Committee at Railway Carriage Repair Depot of Lviv Railway Station. From 1979 to 1984 he worked as Komsomol official. In 1984 he became the Deputy of principal of staff at the construction of Kachinskaja, Achinsk fuel energy complex, Krasnoyarsk Krai. In November 1986 he became Deputy of Machine-Shop Manager, and later, in 1987 he became the Machine-Shop Manager in the Lviv Insulator Plant . From 1989 to 1990 he worked mainly in Communist Party becoming involved as a Full-time Associate, and in late 1990-th he became the Chief Engineer and Vice President of the Joint Stock Company, Galychyna and became the CEO of Small Enterprise "Lavaz". From 1993 to 2002 he became the General Manager of AJPIE-L Co. Ltd. He founded the Trade-Manufacturing Enterprise "Pivdennyj Market", later turning into the largest trade complex of the City of Lviv. In 2000 there was an attempt to assassinate him, but he survived. In 2008 he became an owner of Lviv's newspapers "Ukraina I Chas" and "Informator".

Activity in Verhovna Rada
Since April 2002 to March 2005 – Deputy of Ukrainian Verhovna Rada (Member of Ukrainian Parliament), 4th Convocation. Was elected from election district #124, Lviv Region. Won in district with result of 46,13%,overtaking 6 competitors. Was a member of SDPU(o) (05.2002-12.2004), member of fraction “Regions of Ukraine”(12.2004-09.2005),  member of fraction of the Party “Regions of Ukraine”(from 09.2005), member of the Committee on Economic Policy, Nation's Economy Management, Property and Investment(from June 2002).

Deputy to Verhovna Rada's 5th convocation since April 2006 till November 2007 from the Party of Regions, Number 132 in the list. Member of the Committee on Government Construction, Regional Policy, and local Self-Government (from July 2006), member of the fraction of the Party of Regions.

Deputy to Verhovna Rada's 6th convocation since November 2007 from the Party of Regions, Number 154 in the list. Member of the Party of Regions. Member of the fraction of the Party of Regions (from November 2007), member of the Committee on Budget (from December 2007).

Awards
 Letter of Commendation, granted by Cabinet Council of Ukraine

Charity
Thanks to P.Pysarchuk's help more than twenty villages and homesteads in Lviv Region, have been supplied with conventional gas, such as Borshiv, Lisovi, Mereshiv, Bolotne, Bagiv, Selesjka, Snovychi, Vilhovets, et cetera.
P.Pysarchuk donated to recovery of Zolochiv Castle. These funds were used for restoration of The Kytajskij (The Chinese) and The Korolivskyj(The Royal) Palaces, laying of water and heat supply systems, renewal of facade of The Velykyj(The Grand) Palace, and for construction of tunnel with entrance, ravelin and drawbridge. The monument of sacral art “Джерело”(Spring) was opened near the castle, which became a symbolic entrance sign.
P.Pysarchuk permanently helps various congregations of different confessions. Thanks to his sponsorship nearly 100 churches were restored not only in Lviv Region, but also in Ternopil, Kherson, Odesa and in other Ukrainian regions.
More than 50 million hrivnas were spent to help Lviv Region patient care institutions to strengthen their facilities and equipment.

Family
P.Pysarchuk come from a peasant family. Wife - Oxana Pavlivna (1980), sons - Maxim (1995) and Serhyj (1999), daughter - Justyna-Lubov (2005)

See also
 Party of Regions
 Pivdennyj Market, Lviv (UKR)
 Pivdennyj (Juzhnyj) Market, Lvov (RUS)

External links
 The official site of P.Pysarchuk
 Пётр Писарчук на vlada.kiev.ua
 Пётр Писарчук на da-ta.com.ua

References

1955 births
Living people
People from Lviv Oblast
Social Democratic Party of Ukraine (united) politicians
Party of Regions politicians
Ukrainian manufacturing businesspeople
Fourth convocation members of the Verkhovna Rada
Fifth convocation members of the Verkhovna Rada
Sixth convocation members of the Verkhovna Rada
Recipients of the Honorary Diploma of the Cabinet of Ministers of Ukraine